Kinjarapu Yerran Naidu (23 February 1957 – 2 November 2012) was an Indian politician.

Early life
Yerran Naidu was born on 23 February 1957, in a farmer's family in Nimmada, a remote village in the Srikakulam district of north coastal Andhra. He has a brother, Kinjarapu Atchannaidu, who is also a politician. He has a son Ram Mohan Naidu Kinjarapu, who is also a politician.

Career
Naidu obtained a law degree with first division from the Andhra University in Visakhapatnam, and joined the Telugu Desam Party (TDP) in 1982 when it was formed by popular Telugu cinema actor N. T. Rama Rao.

In 1983, Naidu was elected to the state assembly from Harishchandrapuram in his native district at the age of 25, becoming one of the youngest Members of the Legislative Assembly(MLA). He was re-elected in 1985. Denied a TDP ticket in 1989, he fought as an independent and was re-elected to the assembly. He later returned to the party fold and was elected for the fourth consecutive term in 1994.

He backed N. Chandrababu Naidu when the latter led a revolt against N.T. Rama Rao and became a minister in 1995. He was the Government Chief Whip from 1995 to 1996.

Popularly known as Yeranna among TDP circles, Naidu was fielded by the party in the 1996 Indian general election in Andhra Pradesh. Elected to the Lok Sabha from the Srikakulam constituency, he emerged as a key TDP leader in national politics. With the TDP joining the United Front Government, Naidu became a minister at the centre, holding the portfolio of Rural Development and Employment.

He retained the Lok Sabha seat in the 1998 and 1999 elections. Two days before polling in the 2004 elections, he survived an assassination bid by Naxalites (Maoist Communists) who attempted to bomb his vehicle in Singupuram town in Srikakulam district. Re-elected to parliament, he was made the party leader in the Lok Sabha.

In the 2009 elections, Naidu was defeated by the Congress party's Killi Krupa Rani, who was inducted into the Union ministry on 28 October 2012.

Death
Naidu died from a heart attack after a car accident in his native district Srikakulam, Andhra Pradesh around 2:00 am of 2 November 2012 while returning from a marriage ceremony at Visakhapatnam.The incident took place when a car in which he was travelling hit an oil tanker from behind near Ranasthalam in Srikakulam district in north coastal Andhra, about 25 km from Srikakulam. A severely-injured Naidu was transported to Krishna Institute of Medical Sciences (KIMS) in Srikakulam town, where the doctors' efforts to resuscitate him failed. He was declared dead around 3:30 am.

References

External links

 Official biographical sketch in Parliament of India website

1957 births
2012 deaths
Telugu people
Road incident deaths in India
People from Srikakulam district
Telugu Desam Party politicians
Members of the Andhra Pradesh Legislative Assembly
Lok Sabha members from Andhra Pradesh
India MPs 1999–2004
India MPs 2004–2009
Accidental deaths in India
Andhra University alumni